is a stratovolcano located in the Daisetsuzan Volcanic Group of the Ishikari Mountains, Hokkaidō, Japan.

References
 Geographical Survey Institute

Mountains of Hokkaido
Volcanoes of Hokkaido
Stratovolcanoes of Japan